Jeff Keicher is a Republican member of the Illinois House of Representatives who represents the 70th district. The 70th district included parts of DeKalb County, Kane and Boone counties. Keicher was appointed to the Illinois House of Representatives in July 2018 to replace outgoing Representative Robert W. Pritchard after the latter's appointment to the Northern Illinois University Board of Trustees. Keicher is an insurance agent by trade and resides in Sycamore, Illinois.

As of July 3, 2022, Representative Keicher is a member of the following Illinois House committees:

 Appropriations - Higher Education Committee (HAPI)
 Financial Institutions Committee (HFIN)
 Immigration & Human Rights Committee (SIHR)
 Public Utilities Committee (HPUB)
 Transportation: Vehicles & Safety Committee (HVES)
 Water Subcommittee (HPUB-WATR)

References

External links
 Representative Jeff Keicher (D) 70th District at the Illinois General Assembly
 Campaign website

Republican Party members of the Illinois House of Representatives
Living people
21st-century American politicians
Year of birth missing (living people)